BernieSez is a free-to-use mobile-responsive website created by Terence McEnally, J.D., and James Young, B.S., M.B.A. and launched in November 2013. BernieSez.com enables persons in need of legal services to upload a photo of a traffic citation or briefly describe another legal matter, and have attorneys contact the legal client directly. Attorneys are required to submit their bar credentials and are vetted for ability and reputation before they may participate, thus producing a "curated" pool of legal talent. BernieSez utilizes a closed offer process; lawyers cannot see fee quotes made by other lawyers.

History 
BernieSez is co-owned by Terence McEnally and James Young. McEnally is a lawyer in Wake County.

Through a series of connections, Terence met James (Jim) Young, who is a geologist and owner of Terraine, Inc. Since 2010, Young has focused mainly on technology projects. His company owns software called Adesso, which was used to run a portion of the BernieSez website.

Together, Terence and Jim created the company Legal Software Solutions. The company initiated a soft launch of BernieSez in November 2013.

Philosophy 
By applying this same "aggregating" SaaS model to the provision of legal services, BernieSez creates a more even playing field between lawyers and consumers of legal services.

Location 
BernieSez is based in Raleigh, North Carolina, and headquartered at Raleigh's entrepreneurial and collaborative "think-tank" "HQ" and provides its services in all 50 United States and territories plus Canada.

References

External links 
 

Online marketplaces of the United States
American legal websites